Flasou is a village in the Nicosia District of Cyprus. The village is located 2 km north of Evrychou.

References

Communities in Nicosia District